Greek National Road 81 (abbreviated as EO81) is a single carriageway road in Attica, Greece. It connects the northern suburbs of Athens with Kalamos, near the north coast of Attica. 

81
Roads in Attica